Don Mendo's Revenge is a 1962 Spanish comedy film directed by Fernando Fernán Gómez. It is based on a play by Pedro Muñoz Seca.

Cast
 Fernando Fernán Gómez as Don Mendo Salazar - Marqués de Cabra
 Paloma Valdés as Magdalena
 Juanjo Menéndez as Don Pero Collado, Duque de Toro
 Antonio Garisa as the king Alfonso VII
 Joaquín Roa as Don Nuño Manso de Jarama
 Lina Canalejas as the Queen Berenguela
 María Luisa Ponte as Doña Ramírez
 José Vivó as Marqués de la Moncada
 Paula Martel as Azofaifa

References

External links

1962 comedy films
1962 films
Films based on works by Pedro Muñoz Seca
Films directed by Fernando Fernán Gómez
Spanish comedy films
1960s Spanish-language films
History of Spain on film
Films set in the 12th century
Reconquista in fiction
1960s Spanish films